Olivia "Libby" Tippett (previously Jeffries) is a fictional character on the New Zealand soap opera Shortland Street who was portrayed by Fleur Saville from early-2006 to mid-2010. She returned in a guest appearance during the shows 20th anniversary in 2012. 

Primarily a comedic character, Libby arrived as the final installment to the Jeffries family unit, headed by Yvonne (Alison Quigan) and Ian Jeffries (Jeffrey Thomas). She worked at the hospital as personal assistant to the chief executive officer and her storylines often focused on her determination to find the perfect husband which often ended in disastrous consequences. Several instances included: nearly marrying George Barrington (Sean Lynch) who was a closet gay, Justin Salt (Heath Jones) who attempted to rape her, Kieran Mitchell (Adam Rickett) who was a criminal, Chris Warner (Michael Galvin) who left her for another women, Oliver Ritchie (Mark Warren) who kidnapped her and Isaac Worthington (Matt Minto) who was a serial womanizer. Libby ended up finding the perfect husband in best friend, Gerald Tippett (Harry McNaughton), and the two departed the show together in 2010.

Known for her comedic storylines and fashion sense, the character was highly praised throughout her run, winning "Best New Character" in the 2006 fan awards. She went on to place runner up in "Favourite Female Character" every year from 2006 to 2009.

Creation and casting
Fleur Saville joined Shortland Street in early 2006 as the role of Libby, the middle child in the Jeffries family. The role was originally a guest role, however producers loved the character so much, she was signed to a core cast role. Producer Jason Daniel wanted Libby to embody the role of the Sex and the City characters, without the sex. In 2010, though Saville wasn't sick of the role, she wished to portray more characters and quit. 3 months later, Saville was offered to return to aid the exit of Harry McNaughton, who portrayed Gerald Tippett. Saville was told her character and Gerald were to marry and she found the storyline too good to turn down. She appeared for 2 weeks before leaving once again, making her last appearance on 24 September 2010. In May 2012 Libby returned for the show's 20th anniversary alongside the rest of the Jeffries family. Saville enjoyed returning and said being back was; "like returning home! It was fantastic to see all my friends in the crew and cast and hear what everyone has been up to since I left 2 years ago." The character stayed on screen for two weeks and departed on 28 May 2012. Saville enjoyed the brief reprise and stated; "I’m just happy Libby hasn’t died, I love her!"

Storylines
Libby arrived to Shortland Street where she refused to attend sister, Maia Jeffries' (Anna Jullienne) civil union. She later announced that she was to marry George Barrington (Sean Lynch). However hours before the ceremony, Tania (Faye Smythe) discovered George was gay and the marriage was called off. She took up the position of personal assistant to hospital CEO, Huia Samuels (Nicola Kawana). Libby dates Kieran Mitchell (Adam Rickitt) however they broke up following Kieran straying from the relationship. Libby became best friends with Gerald Tippett (Harry McNaughton) and developed a crush on boss, Chris Warner (Michael Galvin). She briefly dated Sunil (Monish Anand) before she got back together with Kieran. The two got engaged however Libby broke it off following the revelation of Kieran's true criminal colours. She started to date Chris, but lost him to nemesis, Gabrielle Jacobs (Virginie Le Brun). She had a rebound fling with Oliver Ritchie (Mark Warren) however he ended up using her as a science experiment, nearly killing her. Increasingly bored with life in Ferndale, Libby had a brief fling with Isaac Worthington (Matt Minto) before she left the country to start fresh in America. She later returned, having lost her job. She married best friend Gerald, granting her a greencard in America and left once again.

The two returned for Yvonne's (Alison Quigan) birthday but Gerald ended up in need of a heart transplant following heart failure. He got through the ordeal successfully and Libby decided to separate from him. However the two reconciled and left Ferndale together.

Character development

Characterisation
Feisty and determined, Libby was satirically diagnosed by Saville with middle child syndrome, who stated; "She was striving for attention when she was younger and didn't really get it so she went off overseas and became an airline marketing manager." Saville enjoyed playing Libby as she; "throws great tantys" and "She's a perfumed rottweiler," However Saville acknowledged that; "She has high expectations and unrealistic ideals."

Reception
Upon her arrival, Libby was branded; "the best thing to arrive on Shortland Street since Evil Dom" and was said that "she also has some of the funniest lines on the show". Lydia Jenkin of The New Zealand Herald was initially irritating but thoroughly enjoyed her during the 2012 feature-length episode and noted her as a highlight.

References

Shortland Street characters
Television characters introduced in 2006
Female characters in television